Aneilema biflorum is a perennial herb in the family Commelinaceae. It grows in moist and shaded places, often near streams in eastern Australia. A ground covering plant, growing to 20 cm tall. White flowers occur between December and March. The wrinkled fruit is flattened, 4 mm long, with pale grey seeds.

References
 

biflorum
Flora of New South Wales
Flora of Queensland